The Muscocho Lake is a body of water crossed by the Obatogamau River in the territory of Eeyou Istchee James Bay (municipality), in the administrative area of Nord-du-Québec, in the province of Quebec, in Canada. This lake extends in the cantons of Fancamp and Haüy.

Forestry is the main economic activity of the sector. Recreational tourism activities come second.

The hydrographic slope of Muscocho Lake is accessible via the R1040 forest road (going North-South) to the east of the lake and connecting to the north at route 113 (linking Lebel-sur-Quévillon and Chibougamau) and the Canadian National Railway. Haüy Township is located north of the lake.

The surface of Muscocho Lake is usually frozen from early November to mid-May, however safe ice movement is generally from mid-November to mid-April.

Geography

Toponymy
The oldest mention of this hydronym on maps dates back to 1927. Of Cree origin, its meaning is similar to herbs. The term "Muscocho" could come from "maskusiy", a generic term for any kind of grass or hay. According to Father Louis-Philippe Vaillancourt, miskoskou, in Cree, has for sense there is a lot of grass.

The toponym "Lake Muscocho" was formalized on December 5, 1968, by the Commission de toponymie du Québec, when it was created.

Notes and references

See also 

Eeyou Istchee James Bay
Lakes of Nord-du-Québec
Nottaway River drainage basin